is a dam in Shobara, in Hiroshima Prefecture of Japan.

Dams in Hiroshima Prefecture
Dams completed in 2006
Gōnokawa River